Benigno Gilberto Penayo Ortiz (3 April 1933 – 27 October 2020) was a Paraguayan football striker.

Career
Penayo was born in Asunción. He started playing in his school's football team and decided to attend a tryout by Club Libertad where he was turned down. Despite that, Penayo kept trying and was eventually signed by Club Sol de América. He made his debut with the club in 1951 and remained there until 1958 before moving to Cerro Porteño, where he won two national championships and was the 1st division topscorer in 1960 with 18 goals. In 1964 he signed for Club Silvio Pettirossi, his final club before retiring from football in 1965.

Penayo played for the Paraguay national football team in several occasions, most notably in the 1958 FIFA World Cup.

Titles

References

1933 births
2020 deaths
Sportspeople from Asunción
Paraguayan footballers
Club Sol de América footballers
Cerro Porteño players
Paraguay international footballers
1958 FIFA World Cup players
Association football forwards